Izzaq Faris Ramlan (born 18 April 1990, in Kemaman, Terengganu), is a Malaysian footballer who currently plays for Malaysian club Batu Dua as a forward. He was called up by Malaysia 2009 coach K. Rajagobal for their friendly match in Turkey in 2010. Izzaq also played with Harimau Muda in Slovakia and after several good matches with Harimau Muda he was called up for the Malaysian team which participated in the 2010 Asian Games.

In November 2010, Izzaq was called up to the Malaysia national squad by coach K. Rajagopal for the 2010 AFF Suzuki Cup. Malaysia won the 2010 AFF Suzuki Cup title for the first time in their history. He was the Harimau Muda A top scorer in the 2011 Malaysia Super League with 9 goal from 16 appearances.

Honours
Club
 T-Team 
Malaysia FAM League : 2008
 Terengganu City
Malaysia FAM League : 2018
International
Malaysia U23
 Southeast Asian Games : 2011
Malaysia
 AFF Suzuki Cup  : 2010

References
https://web.archive.org/web/20100403024223/http://www.aseanfootball.org/news_d.asp?id=1274

External links
 

1990 births
Living people
Malaysian footballers
Malaysia international footballers
People from Terengganu
Footballers at the 2010 Asian Games
Melaka United F.C. players
Malaysian people of Malay descent
Southeast Asian Games gold medalists for Malaysia
Southeast Asian Games medalists in football
Association football forwards
Competitors at the 2011 Southeast Asian Games
Asian Games competitors for Malaysia